Cindy Seikkula (born March 26, 1958) is an American speed skater. She competed in two events at the 1976 Winter Olympics.

References

External links
 

1958 births
Living people
American female speed skaters
Olympic speed skaters of the United States
Speed skaters at the 1976 Winter Olympics
Sportspeople from Duluth, Minnesota
21st-century American women